Rafsky is a surname. Notable people with the surname include:

 Lawrence C. Rafsky, American data scientist, inventor, and entrepreneur
 Robert Rafsky (1945–1993), American writer, publicist, and HIV/AIDS activist

See also 

 Friedman Rafsky Test